Ptereleotris brachyptera is a species of dartfish in the family Microdesmidae.

References 

brachyptera
Animals described in 2008